Barbara Edith Eileen Wilshere (born 7 December 1959) is a South African-born British actress who has appeared in theatre, films and television.

Early life
She attended Wilmslow County Grammar School for Girls.

Career

She was the guest lead in the fourth episode of Sherlock Holmes ("The Solitary Cyclist"), and was a regular cast member in Albion Market (Carol Broadbent), The Paradise Club (Carol Kane), Between the Lines (Kate Roberts) and The Lakes (Dr. Sarah Kilbride).

Her television work also includes EastEnders, Wallander, Doctors, Heartbeat, Pie in the Sky, Inspector Lynley, The Bill, Holby City, Judge John Deed, Casualty and Peak Practice. In 2020, she portrayed the role of Miriam Shaw in an episode of the BBC soap opera Doctors.

Her film work includes Dean Spanley with Peter O’Toole, and Another Life with Tom Wilkinson.

Personal life
Barbara married the actor Paul Ridley in 1989 and they have two sons, Jack and Hugo.

References

External links 

 
 Barbara's page on Spotlight the Actors' website
 Barbara Wilshere's website
 Jack Ridley's website

1959 births
Living people
British actresses
People from Wilmslow
Place of birth missing (living people)